Fryer is an unincorporated community in Caldwell County, Kentucky, United States. It was also known as The Hall, for a local Grange Hall.

References

Unincorporated communities in Caldwell County, Kentucky
Unincorporated communities in Kentucky